Infinity is the debut album from New Zealand pop duo Deep Obsession. The album peaked at No.8 in the New Zealand album chart, and included three No.1 singles.

Awards and nominations 

At the 2000 New Zealand Music Awards, the album was honoured with five nominations - 
Top Group - Deep Obsession, 
Best Cover - "Lost in Love", 
Best Song - "Cold" (written by Zara Clark/Chris Banks)',  
Top Female Vocalist - Zara Clark, (for her work on the 'Infinity' album)
Most Promising Female Vocalist - Vanessa Kelly (Vanessa sings 'The Power in You' from "Infinity" album)
At the 2001 New Zealand Music Awards, Deep Obsession was nominated for'International Achievement Award'.
In May 2015 NZ Top 40 charts Ruby Awards, Deep Obsession was nominated and won for achieving three consecutive Number One songs from their début album 'Infinity'

Track listing

Charts and certifications

Weekly charts

Certifications

References

Deep Obsession albums
1999 debut albums